Jamides abdul is a butterfly in the family Lycaenidae. It was described by William Lucas Distant in 1886. It is found in the Indomalayan realm.

Subspecies
Jamides abdul abdul (Peninsular Malaysia, Sumatra, Thailand)
Jamides abdul hamid (Fruhstorfer, 1916) (Nias)
Jamides abdul daonides (Röber, 1897) (Java)
Jamides abdul daones (Druce, 1896) (Borneo)
Jamides abdul pemanggilensis Eliot, 1978 (Pulau Pemanggil)
Jamides abdul mayaangelae Takanami, 1992 (Simeulue Islands)

References

External links

Jamides at Markku Savela's Lepidoptera and Some Other Life Forms

Jamides
Butterflies described in 1886